William Richard Nolan (12 July 1929 – 10 January 2019) was an Australian rules footballer who played with South Melbourne in the Victorian Football League (VFL).

Notes

External links 

1929 births
2019 deaths
Australian rules footballers from Victoria (Australia)
Sydney Swans players